Shiroor may refer to various places in India:

Places
 33 Shiroor, a village in Udupi Taluk, Udupi district, Karnataka
 41 Shiroor, a village in Udupi Taluk, Udupi district, Karnataka
 Shiroor Math, a Ashta Mathas of Udupi in the village
 Shiroor, a village in Kundapur Taluk, Udupi district, Karnataka
 Shiroor railway station, a station in Konkan Railway, Karnataka
 Hodke Shiroor, a village in Honnavar Taluk, Uttara Kannada district, Karnataka

See also
 Shirur (disambiguation)